Quiteria was a second-century virgin martyr and saint about whom nothing is certain except her name and her cult. She appears in the Roman Martyrology, but not in any other ancient calendars (such as the Martyrologium Hieronymianum).

Name
Quiteria may be derived from Kythere (or Kyteria, Kuteria), a title applied to the Phoenician goddess Astarte which meant "the red one", or from (the possibly related name) Cytherea, an epithet of the Greek goddess Aphrodite because she was born on the island of Kythira.

Legend   
She is said to have been born in Bracara (now Braga, Portugal) to Lucius Catilius Serves, Roman governor of Gallaecia and Lusitania, and Calcia, his wife. Her father wanted her to marry and renounce Christianity. Quiteria fled and her father's men found her at Aire-sur-l'Adour, in Gascony. She was beheaded on the spot. Her sister, Liberata, also suffered the same fate in the forest of Montus and lies in a 14th-century sarcophagus in the fortified church of Saint Jean Baptiste in Mazéres 32 km from her sister Quiteria in Aire-sur-l'Adour.

Quiteria and the Nonuplet sisters

Portuguese religious traditions state that Quiteria was the leader of the "Nonuplet Sisters," who were named Eumelia (Euphemia); Liberata (Virgeforte); Gema (Marina of Aguas Santas, Margarida); Genebra; Germana; Basilissa; Marica; and Vitoria (Victoria).  These were born in Minho to an important Roman military official. Their mother, disgusted at the fact that she had given birth to nine daughters all at once as if she were a common peasant (or an animal), ordered a maid to take them to a river to drown them. Their father was unaware of their birth.

(Alternately, Calcia, their mother, frightened that her husband would interpret this multiple birth as a sign of infidelity, ordered her servant Sila to drown the girls in the Miñor River.)

Disobeying her mistress, however, the maid gave the girls over to some local women who brought them up as Christians. As adult women, they opposed the worship of Roman gods and were brought before their father, who recognized them as his daughters. Their father wanted them to marry Roman officers or other suitors. The nonuplets refused and were imprisoned in a tower. However, they escaped and liberated all of their other prisoners. They subsequently waged a guerrilla war in the mountains against the Roman Empire.

Quiteria was caught and beheaded. Her sister Eumelia, unable to escape from the soldiers who pursued her, threw herself from a cliff situated today in the Peneda-Gerês National Park (it is called today Penedo da Santa, Cliff of the Saint). A rock opened up and swallowed her and on the spot there sprang up a hot spring.

Popular devotion traditionally places the date of death Liberata on January 18, 139. Liberata's feast day is celebrated on July 20, which is the date for the translation of her relics from the city of Sigüenza to Baiona in 1515. Liberata (in Portuguese Livrada) is the patron saint of Sigüenza. The chapel dedicated to her in the transept of the city's cathedral, with a splendid reredos and the relics of the saint, was constructed at the expense of Bishop Fadrique de Portugal.

In Kuthenkuly

Kuthenkuly, a coastal village in the Indian state of Tamil Nadu is the home to a shrine which is dedicated to Saint Quiteria. The shrine attracts thousands of pilgrims from different places. The shrine is known for its Thursday devotion. Quiteria is the patron saint of this village. The hagiography of Saint Quiteria (Kitheriammal Ammanai), a Tamil language manuscript is preserved in this village. Based on the manuscript, an eight-day play is staged in Kuthenkuly.

Miracles
Saint Quiteria's statue was first brought to the village Kuthenkuly by Thommai Poobalarayar, a native of Kuthenkuly, who made an intension to her for an heir, also built a chapel. His wife gave birth to a boy child and in honour of her, he named his son Kitherian. Many miracles were reported at Kuthenkuly. A Hindu man offered a crown to the statue. While the crown was taken to the chapel, an eagle took the crown and flew away. Saint Quiteria came in the dream of Santhacruz, a guard who was appointed to protect the crown and asked him to go and get the missing crown. Immediately, he went to the chapel and found a broken piece of the crown but the other piece was not present there. He searched on the top of a palm tree, there he found the another piece. Finally, the crown was fixed and offered to the saint's statue.
(Ref: Books printed in Kuthenkuly Parish)
Kindly recheck Saint Quiteria's statue was first brought to the village by whom?

Alternate legend 
Other Portuguese traditions make her a native of Bracara (Braga, Portugal) who was decapitated and thrown into the sea. This legend states that she emerged from the water with her head in her hands, and is thus sometimes represented as such. However, she is not considered one of the Cephalophores because there is no written record to support this. Her patronage against rabies stems from the fact that her legend states that she held two rabid dogs at bay with the power of her saintly voice. A festival in her honor was first held at Tui, Galicia in 2018 after a proclamation was made by its bishop.

References

External links

Saints of May 22: Quiteria
 Santa Quiteria
 As Festas de Santa Quitéria, em Ferrel
 Detalle del retablo de Santa Quiteria
 Santa Quiteria

5th-century Christian saints
Late Ancient Christian female saints
5th-century Christian martyrs
Cephalophores
Gallo-Roman saints
People from Braga
Portuguese saints
Saints from Hispania
Multiple births
Year of birth unknown